Aspidosperma vargasii is a timber tree native to Venezuela (including the Venezuelan islands in the Caribbean), Colombia, Peru, Guyana, and Suriname.

References

vargasii
Plants described in 1844
Trees of Bolivia
Trees of Brazil
Trees of Colombia
Trees of Ecuador
Trees of Guyana
Trees of Peru
Trees of Venezuela